Moving Mountains is the third album by the band Moving Mountains. It was released on September 10, 2013. The track "Seasonal" includes a section covering the song "Source Tags & Codes" by ...And You Will Know Us by the Trail of Dead.

Track listing

Band members
 Gregory Dunn - lead vocals, guitar
 Nicholas Pizzolato - drums
 Mitchell Lee - bass
 Joshua Kirby - guitar, backing vocals

References

2013 albums
Triple Crown Records albums
Moving Mountains (band) albums